Blue Sky is an unincorporated community and a census-designated place (CDP) located in and governed by Morgan County, Colorado, United States. The CDP is a part of the Fort Morgan, CO Micropolitan Statistical Area. The population of the Blue Sky CDP was 65 at the United States Census 2020. The  post office  serves the area.

Geography

Demographics

See also

Colorado census designated places
Morgan County, Colorado

References

External links
Morgan County website

Census-designated places in Morgan County, Colorado
Census-designated places in Colorado